Sascha-Film, in full Sascha-Filmindustrie AG and from 1933 Tobis-Sascha-Filmindustrie AG, was the largest Austrian film production company of the silent film and early sound film period.

History
The business was established in 1910 by Alexander Joseph "Sascha", Count Kolowrat-Krakowsky as the Sascha-Filmfabrik ("Sascha Film Factory") in Pfraumberg in Bohemia, and relocated in 1912 to Vienna. On 10 September 1918, after the merger with the film distributors Philipp & Pressburger, the business became the Sascha-Filmindustrie AG.

With epic films such as Alexander Korda's Prinz und Bettelknabe ("Prince and Beggar") (1920) and Michael Curtiz's Sodom und Gomorrha (1922) as well as Die Sklavenkönigin ("The Slave Queen") (1924), the company rose to be one of the most successful European film producers.

In 1933 the German enterprise Tobis-Tonbild-Syndikat was amalgamated with the company, known formally from then on as the Tobis-Sascha-Filmindustrie AG.

In 1938, in the context of the Anschluss, by which Austria was annexed to the Third Reich, the concern passed into the ownership of the National Socialist government and was re-founded as Wien-Film GmbH. Its best-known director of the period to the end of the war was Gustav Ucicky.

After the end of the war the name Sascha-Film was re-established for a couple of decades, and in the 1950s and 1960s produced light entertainment films.

Selected films
 1912: Die Gewinnung des Erzes am steirischen Erzberg in Eisenerz ("The extraction of ore on the Styrian ore mountain in Eisenerz"; documentary, c. 6 min; direction by Sascha Kolowrat-Krakowsky)
 1912: Kaiser Joseph II.
 1913: Der Millionenonkel (c. 60 min; direction by Hubert Marischka)
 1915: Das andere Ich (direction by Fritz Freisler)
 1916: Wien im Krieg (direction by Heinz Hanus
 1917: Heldenkampf in Schnee und Eis
 1918: Der Mandarin (61 min; direction by Paul Frank, Fritz Freisler)
 1922: Sodom und Gomorrha (direction by Michael Curtiz)
 1922: Harun al Rashid (direction by Michael Curtiz)
 1923: Der junge Medardus (direction by Michael Curtiz)
 1924: Die Sklavenkönigin (70 min; direction by  Michael Curtiz)
 1925: Das Spielzeug von Paris (direction by Michael Curtiz)
 1927: Café Elektric (direction by Gustav Ucicky)
 1927: Die Pratermizzi
 1929: Bright Eyes (co-production with British International Pictures)
 1930: Geld auf der Straße (direction by  Georg Jacoby)
 1934: Maskerade (direction by Willi Forst)
 1934: Hohe Schule (direction by Erich Engel)

See also 
 Cinema of Austria

References 
 Herbert Polak, 1948. 30 Jahre Sascha-Film: Festschrift der Sascha-Film Verein- und Vertriebs- Ges. m.b.H. Wien. Vienna.

External links 
  Vienna Cinema and Theatre Topography Project
  History of  Vienna website
  AEIOU Encyclopedia article

Mass media companies established in 1910
Film production companies of Austria
Austrian film studios
Neubau
Culture in Vienna
1910 establishments in Austria